I Won't Let Go  may refer to:
"I Won't Let Go" (InMe song)
"I Won't Let Go" (Janelle Monáe song)
"I Won't Let Go" (Rascal Flatts song)
"I Won't Let Go", a song by John P. Kee from the album Colorblind (1994), also on the compilation WOW Gospel 2004
"I Won't Let Go", a single by Monarchy (band)
"I Won't Let Go", a single by Real Blondes
"I Won't Let Go", a single by The System (band)
"I Won't Let Go", a song by Mike Tramp from the album More to Life Than This